Bromus berteroanus, commonly known as Chilean chess, is a species of flowering plant in the family Poaceae native to drier areas of North and South America.

References

berteroanus